American actor and director Morgan Freeman has had a prolific career on film, television and on the stage. His film debut was as an uncredited character in the Sidney Lumet–directed drama The Pawnbroker in 1964. Freeman also made his stage debut in the same year by appearing in the musical Hello, Dolly! He followed this with further stage appearances in The Niggerlovers (1967), The Dozens (1969), Exhibition (1969), and the musical Purlie (1970–1971).  He played various characters on the children's television series The Electric Company (1971–1977). Freeman subsequently appeared in the films Teachers in 1984, and Marie in 1985 before making his breakthrough with 1987's Street Smart. His role earned him a nomination for the Academy Award for Best Supporting Actor. Two years later he appeared in war film Glory (1989), and starred as Hoke Coleburn  in the comedy-drama Driving Miss Daisy (1989). Freeman won the Golden Globe Award for Best Actor – Motion Picture Musical or Comedy for his performance in the latter and also earned a nomination for the Academy Award for Best Actor.

In the 1990s, he was cast in numerous films, including the adventure film Robin Hood: Prince of Thieves (1991) opposite Kevin Costner, drama The Shawshank Redemption (1994) with Tim Robbins, psychological thriller Seven (1995), historical drama Amistad (1997), crime thriller Kiss the Girls (1997), and science fiction disaster film Deep Impact (1998). His role in The Shawshank Redemption earned him a second nomination for the Academy Award for Best Actor. In 2003, he played God in the comedy Bruce Almighty opposite Jim Carrey. The following year Freeman played Eddie "Scrap Iron" Dupris in Clint Eastwood's film Million Dollar Baby (2004), for which he won an Academy Award for Best Supporting Actor.

Freeman played Lucius Fox in a trilogy of Batman films: Batman Begins (2005), The Dark Knight (2008), and The Dark Knight Rises (2012). During that time, Freeman also appeared in The Bucket List (2007) opposite Jack Nicholson, Wanted (2008) with Angelina Jolie, and Invictus (2009) with Matt Damon. In 2011, Freeman received the AFI Life Achievement Award from the American Film Institute. Two years later he starred in action thriller Olympus Has Fallen (2013), science fiction film Oblivion (2013), caper Now You See Me (2013), and comedy Last Vegas. In 2014, Freeman appeared in the science fiction films Transcendence and Lucy.

Freeman has also narrated several documentaries and television series, including Cosmic Voyage (1996), Slavery and the Making of America (2004), March of the Penguins (2005), and Breaking the Taboo (2011). He was also the host and narrator for the series Through the Wormhole from 2010 to 2017.

Film

Television

Narrator

Music videos

Video games

Theatre

See also
 List of awards and nominations received by Morgan Freeman

Notes

References

External links
 
 
 Morgan Freeman at the Internet Off-Broadway Database

Male actor filmographies
American filmographies